Adams v. Texas, 448 U.S. 38 (1980), was a United States Supreme Court case in which the Court held on an 8–1 vote that, consistent with its prior opinion in Witherspoon v. Illinois, a Texas requirement that jurors swear an oath that the mandatory imposition of a death sentence would not interfere with their consideration of factual matters such as guilt or innocence during a trial was unconstitutional.

The surrounding factual issues (involving defendant Randall Dale Adams) were the subject of a partially autobiographical book of the same name, and were featured in the 1988 movie The Thin Blue Line.

Further reading

External links
 
Adams v. The Death Penalty

United States Supreme Court cases
1980 in United States case law
United States Sixth Amendment jury case law
United States Supreme Court cases of the Burger Court